The 1954–55 UCLA Bruins men's basketball team represented the University of California, Los Angeles during the 1954–55 NCAA men's basketball season and were members of the Pacific Coast Conference. The Bruins were led by seventh year head coach John Wooden. They finished the regular season with a record of 21–5 and won the PCC Southern Division with a record of 11–1.

Previous season

The Bruins finished the regular season with a record of 18–7 and finished 2nd in the PCC Southern Division with a record of 7–5.

Roster

Schedule

|-
!colspan=9 style=|Regular Season

|-
!colspan=9 style=|Conference Championship Play-offs

Source

Rankings

References

UCLA Bruins men's basketball seasons
Ucla
UCLA Bruins Basketball
UCLA Bruins Basketball